Ponderinella ghanensis is a species of minute sea snail, a marine gastropod mollusk or micromollusk in the family Elachisinidae.

Description

Distribution
This species occurs in the Atlantic Ocean off West Africa.

References

 Rolán E. & Ryall P. (2000). A new species of the genus Notosetia (Molluscs, Skeneidae) from Ghana. Argonauta 14(2): 39-41.
 Rolán E. & Rubio F. 2012. A new species and range extension of Ponderinella (Gastropoda, Tornidae) in West Africa. Iberus, 30(2): 35-39

Elachisinidae
Gastropods described in 2000